Bellshill Central Parish Church is a Parish church of the Church of Scotland, serving the around 70% of the town of Bellshill, North Lanarkshire - including Bellshill town centre, Mossend, Milnwood and Orbiston. It is within the Church of Scotland's Presbytery of Hamilton.

The building
The main church building and hall was designed by David Clunas and constructed in 1874. It is described as a Gothic, gabled rectangular-plan church with set-back gabletted buttresses with pairs of Gothic rectangular windows with inverted rounded corners and vertical stone mullions, on both upper and lower levels.  It is set back from the main road and the principal elevation has a pointed-arch timber panelled door to centre. Flanking hooded pointed-arch lancet windows; large hooded pointed-arch triple light window above with tracery and stone mullions. There is a cast iron decorative finial at the apex.  BOUNDARY: small squared sandstone wall with saddleback coping and modern railings and gate furniture.

There is a galleried interior, narthex with flanking stairs to gallery. Boarded dado. Timber pews. Cast-iron columns supporting panelled gallery. Communion table in front of timber pulpit with stair access and timber Gothic panelled organ and case behind.   A notable feature of the building are the vast array of stained glass windows adorning the sanctuary and narthex.  The most recently installed stained glass window was designed and executed by a Church Member, Lesley Marshall, and is located in the narthex.

The Church Hall is located immediately behind the church building and is accessed down each side of the church at two entrances.  The hall was refurbished following the sale of the former manse (located also at 346 Main Street) and the former Blackie Memorial Hall.  The hall building consists of a large hall, male/female and disabled toilets, office and large kitchen.

History
Bellshill Central Parish Church was formed by the union of the former MacDonald Memorial and Orbiston Churches.  The suite of buildings chosen by the Church of Scotland for use of the new united congregation was the buildings at 346 Main Street (formerly MacDonald Memorial Church). The former Orbiston buildings continue in community use as the base for the Orbiston Neighbourhood Centre.

Macdonald Memorial Church began in 1873 as a Free Church Mission, at the recommendation of the Free Church Presbytery of Hamilton and services were for a time held in Mossend school. The charge was sanctioned in 1874.  The rapid growth of the population, employed in coal mines and iron works, favoured the development of the congregation.  Initial Membership figures were: 143 in 1875, and 477 in 1900.  The first Minister was William Macdonald, who the church was renamed after in 1912.

Orbiston Parish Church, being one of the later to be built in the area due to post-war building, was first started as an extension charge in the wooden hall.  The dedication service was held on 9 March 1954.  With a quickly increasing membership the church on Busby Rd was built with the dedication service held on 13 September 1956 and the first Sunday service was conducted by the minister Rev Albert F Bolton on Sunday 16 September 1956. By 1966 the church had received full Quoda Sacra status and had a membership of almost 500 communicants. It was linked with Bellshill St Andrews Church in October 1980 then linked with MacDonald Memorial Church in 2001.

Organ
Bellshill Central Parish Church houses a rare pipe organ by the H. Hildson organ company of Glasgow. It is a two manual and pedal organ, with detached console. It consists of 17 stops, and accessories. It was refurbished in 2015 by Michael and Andrew Macdonald organ builders from Glasgow.  Apart from having its action changed from pneumatic to electric solid state, it has remained tonally unchanged since its construction in 1930. It has been registered on the National Pipe Organ Register.

Ministry
Bellshill Central Parish Church was served by Rev Ian Mackenzie as Locum Minister from 2014 to March 2016.   Rev Kevin de Beer was inducted as the first permanent minister by the Presbytery of Hamilton on 10 March 2016.

Rev Kevin de Beer served as a Minister of the Methodist Church of South Africa for over 20 years before moving to Scotland in 2015 with his family to take up a probationer placement with the Church of Scotland, before being recommended to apply for vacant charges.  The probationary period was with East Kilbride: Morncrieff Parish Church. In addition to being parish minister for Bellshill Central Parish, he is chaplain to Bellshill Academy and Mossend Primary Schools, and part of the ministry team at the Orbiston Neighbourhood Centre.

Part of Kevin's ministry is Bellshill Central Parish Church's online presence and archived recordings of sermons and services.  An active Facebook page helps us connect with our congregation and community.   Kevin is also an author, having four publications available online via Amazon.  His biography says "a minister of the Gospel, with over 25 years experience, as well as being father of two children, who constantly ask questions about God and Life. His books are a helpful primer for all those who want to discuss biblical stories and are not sure where to start"

References

Further reading
Church of Scotland Yearbook, 2008–9,  
Church of Scotland Parishes
Dictionary of Scottish Architects

External links
 Church Website
 Hamilton Presbytery
 Orbiston Neighbourhood Centre

Church of Scotland churches in Scotland
Bellshill